In mathematics, Wiener deconvolution is an application of the Wiener filter to the noise problems inherent in deconvolution. It works in the frequency domain, attempting to minimize the impact of deconvolved noise at frequencies which have a poor signal-to-noise ratio.

The Wiener deconvolution method has widespread use in image deconvolution applications, as the frequency spectrum of most visual images is fairly well behaved and may be estimated easily.

Wiener deconvolution is named after Norbert Wiener.

Definition 

Given a system:

where  denotes convolution and:

 is some original signal (unknown) at time .
 is the known impulse response of a linear time-invariant system
 is some unknown additive noise, independent of 
 is our observed signal

Our goal is to find some  so that we can estimate  as follows:

where  is an estimate of  that minimizes the mean square error

 ,

with  denoting the expectation.
The filter is most easily described in the frequency domain:

where:

  is the mean power spectral density of the original signal ,
  is the mean power spectral density of the noise ,
 the superscript  denotes complex conjugation.

The filtering operation may either be carried out in the time-domain, as above, or in the frequency domain:

Interpretation 

The operation of the Wiener filter becomes apparent when the filter equation above is rewritten:

When there is zero noise (i.e. infinite signal-to-noise), the term inside the square brackets equals 1, which means that the Wiener filter is simply the inverse of the system, as we might expect. However, as the noise at certain frequencies increases, the signal-to-noise ratio drops, so the term inside the square brackets also drops. This means that the Wiener filter attenuates frequencies according to their filtered signal-to-noise ratio.

The Wiener filter equation above requires us to know the spectral content of a typical image, and also that of the noise.  Often, we do not have access to these exact quantities, but we may be in a situation where good estimates can be made.  For instance, in the case of photographic images, the signal (the original image) typically has strong low frequencies and weak high frequencies, while in many cases the noise content will be relatively flat with frequency.

Derivation 

As mentioned above, we want to produce an estimate of the original signal that minimizes the mean square error, which may be expressed:

 .

If we expand the quadratic, we get the following:

However, we are assuming that the noise is independent of the signal, therefore:

This final equality can be rearranged to give the Wiener filter.

See also 
 Information field theory
 Deconvolution
 Wiener filter
 Point spread function
 Blind deconvolution
 Fourier transform

References 

 Rafael Gonzalez, Richard Woods, and Steven Eddins. Digital Image Processing Using Matlab. Prentice Hall, 2003.

External links 
 Comparison of different deconvolution methods.

Signal estimation
Image noise reduction techniques